The 1985 Cronulla-Sutherland Sharks season was the nineteenth in the club's history. They competed in the NSWRL's 1985 Winfield Cup premiership as well as the 1985 National Panasonic Cup, in which they reached the final.

Ladder

References

Cronulla-Sutherland Sharks seasons
Cronulla-Sutherland Sharks season